Martin Condon, born 1857 in Hawkins County, was Knoxville, Tennessee's first Irish Catholic mayor.  Prior to becoming mayor, Condon was a wholesale grocery businessman.

See also
 List of mayors of Knoxville, Tennessee

References

External links 
The career of Knoxville's first Irish Catholic mayor

American people of Irish descent
People from Knoxville, Tennessee
Mayors of Knoxville, Tennessee
1857 births
Year of death missing